Goat Island is an island in the Columbia River in Columbia County, Oregon. It is located adjacent to Deer Island. Goat Island was named as such by the United States Board on Geographic Names in 1976.

References

Islands of the Columbia River in Oregon
Landforms of Columbia County, Oregon
Uninhabited islands of Oregon